National Olympic Committee of Timor Leste (IOC code: TLS) is the National Olympic Committee representing East Timor, also known as Timor-Leste.

See also
East Timor at the Olympics

External links 
National Olympic Committee of East Timor

Timor Leste
Olympic
East Timor at the Olympics
2003 establishments in East Timor
Sports organizations established in 2003